In Russia, the Kazakh population lives in the regions bordering Kazakhstan. The 2010 Russian census recorded 647,732 Kazakhs living mostly in the Astrakhan Oblast, Volgograd Oblast, Samara Oblast, Orenburg Oblast, Chelyabinsk Oblast, Kurgan Oblast, Tyumen Oblast, Omsk Oblast, Novosibirsk Oblast and Altai Krai regions. During the 1920s significant numbers of Kazakh families were left outside the designated Kazakh Soviet Socialist Republic; after the end of the Soviet Union in 1991, they acquired Russian citizenship.

Notable Kazakh Russians 
 Gulzhan Moldazhanova (Kazakh: Gulzhan Talapkyzy Moldazhanova) is a businesswoman who served as CEO for Basic Element and was named among the most powerful women of the mid- to late 2000s. In 2018, she and others resigned from Russian company Rusal as it was facing sanctions from the US.
 Elizabet Tursynbayeva (Kazakh: Elizabet Tursynbayeva) is a Kazakh figure skater. She is the 2019 World silver medalist, the 2019 Four Continents silver medalist, the 2019 Winter Universiade silver medalist. Tursynbayeva is the first female skater to land a quadruple jump in senior competition.
 Damir Ismagulov (Kazakh: Damir Amankeldyuly Ismagulov) is a Russian mixed martial artist of Kazakh heritage, who is currently fighting in the Lightweight division for the Ultimate Fighting Championship. He is the former M-1 Global lightweight champion.
 Talgat Musabayev (Talǵat Amankeldiuly Musabaev) is a Kazakh test pilot and former cosmonaut who flew on three spaceflights. 
 Timur Bekmambetov (Kazakh: Temir Nurbakytuly Bekmambetov); is a Russian-Kazakh director, producer and screenwriter who has worked on films, music videos and commercials. He is best known for the film Night Watch (2004) and its sequel Day Watch (2006), and the American films Wanted (2008) and Abraham Lincoln: Vampire Hunter (2012).
 Altynai Asylmuratova (Kazakh: Altynaı Abdýahımqyzy Asylmuratova) is artistic director of the ballet company at Astana Opera[1], and a former prima ballerina with the Kirov Ballet/Mariinsky Theatre and a guest artist all over the world.
 Erik Kurmangaliev (Kazakh: Erik Salimuly Kurmangaliev) was a Russian-Kazakh opera singer, actor and a leading public figure in Russia's perestroika music scene.
 Eldor Urazbayev (Eldar Muhameduly Urazbayev) - Russian film director, screenwriter and Producer Honored Worker of Culture of the Russian Federation (1998).
 Askar Zhumagaliyev (Kazakh: Asqar Qýanyshuly Jumaǵalıev) is Kazakh politician. He was the Deputy Prime Minister of the Republic of Kazakhstan from 29 August 2017 until the government was dismissed on 25 February 2019. Zhumagaliyev was the Deputy Minister for Investment and Development of Kazakhstan,
 Aman Tuleyev (Kazakh: Amangeldi Moldaǵazıulı Tóleev), is a Russian statesman. He served as governor of Kemerovo Oblast from 1997 to 2018 and became the chairman of the Council of People's Deputies of the Kemerovo oblast since April 2018.
 Vladimir Vasilyev (politician) (Kazakh: Alik Abdualiuly Asanbayev) is a Russian politician. Head of the Republic of Dagestan. 
 Batyrkhan Shukenov (Kazakh: Batyrhan Qamaluly Shúkenov) was a Soviet Kazakhstan and Russian singer, musician, composer, and poet. 
 Bari Alibasov (Kazakh: Bari Karimuly Alibasov) is a Moscow-based musical producer best known for creating a successful Russian boy band Na-Na in 1989. Previously he had managed the jazz band Integral from 1965 till 1989. Meritorious Artist of Russia (1999).
 Albina Dzhanabaeva (Kazakh: Albina Boriskyzy Dzhanabaeva) is a Russian singer, actress, TV-Host. Best known for being a member in the Ukrainian girl group VIA Gra from 2004 to 2013.
 Natalya Arinbasarova (Kazakh: Наталья Өтеуліқызы Орынбасарова) is a Soviet actress. 
 Kai Metov (Russian: Кай Метов; September 19, 1964, Karaganda, Kazakh SSR, USSR) is a Russian singer-songwriter and composer. Honored Artist of Russia (2015).

References 
 Сайт «Казахи России» (при содействии посольства РК в РФ): новости, культура, форум (рус.,каз.,англ.)
 Форум российских казахов
 Казахи в составе России в конце XIX века: их численность, размещение, занятия и образовательный уровень
 Актуальность изучения этнической группы казахов Степного Алтая
 Казахстанская правда: Поднять статус казахского языка (об Астраханской области, август 2003)
 Мавзолей Курмангазы
 Интервью с лидером самарской казахской общины
 Боронин О. В., Быков А. Ю. Исторические предпосылки современного восприятия казахов юга Горного Алтая алтайцами…
 Казахские национально-культурные центры — одни из самых активных и деятельных в Алтайском крае
 Карта доли казахов до уровня сельского поселения ПФО

Central Asian diaspora in Russia
Ethnic groups in Russia
Russia
Kazakhstani diaspora